Major Whirlwind or  is a 1967 television film directed by Yevgeny Tashkov and based on the novel by Yulian Semyonov. The main character, Major Whirlwind, is inspired by Aleksey Nikolayevich Botyan.

Plot
Summer 1944. In impotent rage before impending disaster, management of the SS with the support of Hitler undertakes a special program of extermination of Slavic cultural capitals. Kraków, Bratislava, Prague   all these cities must be mined and razed to the ground with explosions.  The Soviet command sends a special group of Major Whirlwind  into occupied Kraków, consisting of three people, whose aim is to prevent the destruction of the city. The release of the group is unsuccessful,  Whirlwind  gets shipped to the Gestapo, but later he manages to escape.

Agents start to take action. The Polish underground collects valuable information about the German troops in Kraków, and radio operator  Anya transmits them to the Soviet command. However, during one of radio transmissions, location of the transmitter is traced, and  Anya   is arrested by the Abwehr. Abwehr Colonel Berg in conjunction with the Gestapo holds an operation for recruiting  Anya  for the subsequent radio play. He tells the radio operator that supposedly he is ready to cooperate with the Soviet intelligence and pass important information on to them. Berg manages to convince  Anya  and she even sends coded disinformation prepared by the Gestapo. However, after the arrest of his chief Admiral Canaris in connection with the 20 July plot, Colonel Berg decides to establish genuine contact with the Soviet intelligence. He meets with  Whirlwind  and organizes  Anya's  escape.

With Berg's group,  Whirlwind  gets information about the specific organizers of the Kraków explosion. Attempting to influence the Chief Executive of the act,   SS officer Libo, is a failure. However,  Whirlwind  manages to capture engineer Krauch, who when saving his own life, draws a diagram of the Kraków explosion network. In the last hours before the destruction of the city,  Whirlwind  and the Polish underground find the main cable, blow it up and fiercely defend the place of the explosion. Brave heroes die, German soldiers are already prepared to repair the damaged cable, but Soviet tanks are not far away and the Nazis flee.

Cast
 Vadim Beroev as Major Whirlwind 
 Anastasia Voznesenskaya as Anya, radio operator
 Viktor Pavlov    as Kolya, Whirlwind's deputy
 Alexander Schirvindt as Jozef, Polish underground fighter
 Yevgeny Teterin as  Sedoi, Polish underground fighter
 Lyudmila Davydova as Krysya, Polish underground fighter
 Igor Yasulovich as Kurt Appel, German soldier-driver, Krysya's groom
 Yevgeni Burenkov as Borodin, soviet intelligence colonel
 Yuri Volyntsev as Hugo Shwalb, Gestapo officer
 Vladimir Kenigson as Traub, German military journalist
 Vladislav Strzhelchik as Berg, Abwehr colonel
 Yevgeniy Kuznetsov as Friedrich-Wilhelm Krüger, SD chief of Kraków
 Vladimir Gusev as Mukha, traitor
 Oleg Golubitsky as interpreter
 Georgi Shevtsov as Stromberg, Wehrmacht major 
 Konstantin Zheldin as Gestapo officer, Kolya's  who questioned  
 Boris Bibikov as Neubutt, Wehrmacht colonel-general
 Vladimir Osenev as Krauch, German colonel-engineer
 Peeter Kard as Gustav Libo, SS Obersturmbannführer
 Vladimir Pitsek as hairdresser
 Sergei Golovanov as Birghoff, Wehrmacht officer
 Valentin Golubenko as Gestapo officer
 Valentina Sharykina as girl dancing at the restaurant
 Aleksandra Denisova as old Polish woman
 Alevtina Rumyantseva as waitress
 Victor Filippov as Polish partisan

See also
 Seventeen Moments of Spring

References

External links

1967 films
Mosfilm films
Soviet television films
Soviet war adventure films
1960s Russian-language films
1960s war adventure films
Soviet black-and-white films
Stierlitz
Soviet World War II films
Russian World War II films
Films set in Kraków
Films set in 1944
Films about the 20 July plot